The 2023 Northeast Conference Women's Basketball Tournament will be the postseason women's basketball tournament for the Northeast Conference for the 2022–23 NCAA Division I women's basketball season. The tournament will take place on three dates between March 6, 9 and March 12, 2023, and all tournament games will be played on home arenas of the higher-seeded school. The tournament winner will receive the automatic bid to the NCAA Tournament.

Seeds 
All eight eligible teams of the nine members of the conference will qualify. Effective for the 2022–23 academic year, NEC teams transitioning from Division II are eligible for the NEC tournament during their third and fourth years of the transition period. If a reclassifying institution wins the NEC tournament championship, the conference's automatic bid to the NCAA tournament goes to the NEC tournament runner up. The rule change regarding reclassifying institutions results in Merrimack being eligible for the 2023 NEC tournament, since it is in its fourth transition year.

Teams will be seeded by record within the conference, with a tiebreaker system to seed teams with identical conference records.

Stonehill College joined the Northeast Conference from the Division II Northeast-10 Conference. Stonehill is ineligible for the NCAA tournament until the 2026–27 season during its four-year reclassification period and won't be eligible for the NEC tournament until the 2024–25 season.

Schedule

Bracket 
Teams are reseeded after each round with highest remaining seeds receiving home court advantage.

References 

2022–23 Northeast Conference women's basketball season
Northeast Conference women's basketball tournament
Northeast Conference women's basketball tournament